Adolf Repsold (31 August 1806 – 13 March 1871) was a German astronomical and scientific instrument maker, son of the astronomer and fireman Johann Georg Repsold. He established the company A. & G. Repsold along with his brother and it was continued by his son Johann Adolf Repsold under the name of A. Repsold & Söhne in Hamburg.

Repsold was born in Hamburg, the son of fire-brigade captain and astronomer Johann Georg Repsold who died in a fire in 1830 after which he took his father's place in the fire service. Along with his brother Georg Repsold (1804–1867), they continued their father's instrument business as A. & G. Repsold company specializing in the fabrication of astronomical and scientific instruments. Collaborations with Carl August Steinheil led to several innovations including a measuring graticule within the eyepiece. Repsold's instruments were widely in use in astronomical observatories across Europe and included the Oxford Heliometer. A universal (theodolite) instrument made by Repsold was used in the geodetic surveys of Friedrich Georg Wilhelm Struve. Repsold made his son Johann Adolf (also known as Hans) a partner in 1858. Repsold left the company in 1867 to his sons Johann Adolf and Oscar. The company continued in existence until 1919 when it was shut down.

References 

1806 births
1871 deaths
Scientific instrument makers